New Liberty School may refer to:

New Liberty School (Liberty, Arkansas), listed on the National Register of Historic Places in Logan County, Arkansas
New Liberty School (Vardaman, Mississippi), listed on the National Register of Historic Places in Calhoun County, Mississippi